Per Fresk (born 20 February 1933) is a Swedish equestrian. He competed in two events at the 1960 Summer Olympics.

References

External links
 

1933 births
Living people
Swedish male equestrians
Olympic equestrians of Sweden
Equestrians at the 1960 Summer Olympics
People from Falun
Sportspeople from Dalarna County